James Albert Norton (November 11, 1843 – July 24, 1912) was an American educator and Civil War veteran who served three terms a U.S. Representative from Ohio from 1897 to 1903.

Biography
Norton was born in Bettsville, Ohio and attended the district schools where he graduated from Tiffin High School.

During the Civil War he enlisted in the Union Army in August 1862. He was a sergeant in Company K, One Hundred and First Regiment, Ohio Volunteer Infantry. He was later promoted to first lieutenant and adjutant of the One Hundred and Twenty-third Regiment, United States Colored Infantry, in 1864.

He mustered out of the service in 1865.

Postbellum
After the war Norton studied medicine and commenced practice in Ohio in 1867 and continued in that profession until 1879.

He studied law and was admitted to the bar in 1879.

He served as member of the State house of representatives 1873-1879, and as chairman of the State Democratic committee 1887-1892.

From 1885-1892 he served as County auditor and as commissioner of railroads and telegraphs from 1889 to 1895, when he resigned to accept a position in the legal department of the Baltimore & Ohio Railroad Co..

Congress 
Norton was elected as a Democrat to the Fifty-fifth, Fifty-sixth, and Fifty-seventh Congresses (March 4, 1897 - March 3, 1903).

He was an unsuccessful candidate for reelection in 1902 to the Fifty-eighth Congress and resumed legal service with the Baltimore & Ohio Railroad.

Death
He died July 24, 1912 in Tiffin, Ohio and was interred in a mausoleum in Green Lawn Cemetery.

References
 Retrieved on 2009-04-17
 

1843 births
1912 deaths
County auditors in the United States
People from Seneca County, Ohio
Ohio lawyers
Union Army officers
Baltimore and Ohio Railroad people
Democratic Party members of the Ohio House of Representatives
Physicians from Ohio
19th-century American politicians
19th-century American lawyers
Democratic Party members of the United States House of Representatives from Ohio
19th-century American businesspeople